Retamoso de la Jara is a village in the province of Toledo and autonomous community of  Castile-La Mancha, Spain. In 2004 the municipality changed its name of Retamoso by Retamoso de la Jara.

References

Populated places in the Province of Toledo